Redhouse is a small village in the Eastern Cape of South Africa, located to the north of the city of Port Elizabeth. It is adjacent to a declared wetland reserve, soon hopefully to be a Ramsar site.

The village is situated on the Zwartkops River, and is host to the Redhouse Yacht Club. The village was built around the Redhouse train station which is a stopping point for passenger and goods trains coming from or going to the Port Elizabeth harbour.
There are over 10,000 water birds here, in the summer, including beautiful flamingos aplenty.
There are no shops or businesses in Redhouse, apart from two bed and breakfast establishments, and this village is truly a hidden gem. There is a small primary school, a church, a lawn bowling club, a squash court, a sailing club, library, and quaint village hall. A superb riverside destination, to relax and find peace.

References

Port Elizabeth
Populated places in Nelson Mandela Bay